Members of the standing committees of the Chinese Communist Party provincial-level committees, commonly referred to as Shengwei Changwei, make up the top ranks of the provincial-level organizations of the Chinese Communist Party (CCP). In theory, the Standing Committee of a Party Committee manages the day-to-day party affairs of a provincial party organization, and are selected from the members of the provincial-level Party Committee at large. In practice, Shengwei Changwei is a position with significant political power, and their appointments are essentially directed by the central leadership through the Organization Department of the Chinese Communist Party.

Terminology 
 Shengwei Changwei, technically, only refer to Standing Committee members of a province. Standing Committee members of the four direct-controlled municipalities are known as Shiwei Changwei. Standing Committee members of the autonomous regions are known as Zizhiqu Dangwei Changwei or Qu Dangwei Changwei for short.
 Changweihui: The Standing Committee, or, alternatively, a meeting of the Standing Committee (depending on the context in which this term is used)
 Ruchang: to be selected to join the Standing Committee, or to enter the Standing Committee. The same term can be used for Politburo Standing Committee members. This term is an abbreviation, and became popular during the internet era.
 Shengwei Weiyuan refers to a member of the provincial-level Party Committee, which is distinct from the Standing Committee. Standing Committee members are selected from members of the Party Committee.

Membership and rankings 

In each province, direct-controlled municipality, or autonomous region, membership in a Standing Committee ranges between 11 and 15 individuals. The leading members are ranked by the office they hold. The Party Secretary (or party chief) is ranked first, followed by the head of government (called a "governor" in provinces, but a "mayor" in municipalities and "chairman" in autonomous regions), always ranked second, and a zhuanzhi Deputy Party Secretary (that is, a "full-time" deputy party chief who oversees party affairs) is always ranked third. Often, but not always, a discipline inspection secretary is ranked fourth. Apart from these established ranking conventions, the remaining ranks of the Standing Committees are ordered by the date of advancement to the sub-provincial (vice-minister) level (among other things).

In general, the heads of the provincial-level Organization Department (in charge of human resources and personnel) and Propaganda Department (in charge of disseminating the party's agenda) earn ex officio seats on the provincial-level Standing Committee. Usually, the head of the Zhengfawei (i.e., Political and Legal Affairs Commission), the Secretary of Discipline Inspection, the party committee's Secretary-General, a representative from the military (usually, a commissar or a commanding officer of the local military district), and the first-ranked deputy head of government also have seats on the Standing Committee. In the provinces and autonomous regions, the party chiefs of the provincial capital also usually sit on the Standing Committee. The party chiefs of other large subdivisions may also sit on the Standing Committee, although this is not a strict rule. Occasionally, the head of the provincial-level United Front Department and the chair of the provincial Federation of Trade Unions organization also holds a seat on the Standing Committee.

Shengwei Changwei are considered sub-provincial-level (fushengji) officials, meaning their ranks are equivalent to that of a deputy provincial governor or a vice minister of the state. Where both Shengwei Changwei and provincial vice-governors (who are not also Shengwei Changwei) are present, the Shengwei Changwei ranks above the vice-governor. Provincial Standing Committee members are accorded fushengji rank if their concurrent post does not already afford them an equal or higher rank. For example, the party chief of Xining, capital of Qinghai province, would otherwise be considered a department-level (tingjuji) official but the fact that he sits on the provincial Standing Committee makes him rank one level higher; in fact, he would actually rank higher than an ordinary provincial vice-governor who does not sit on the Standing Committee. Conversely, the party chief of Beijing is usually also a Politburo member. He, therefore, holds a sub-national rank by virtue of his Politburo membership, which is two ranks above a typical Shengwei Changwei.

Qualifications and composition
The gradual 'professionalization' of Communist Party cadres began in the 1990s, which meant that more emphasis was placed on candidate's educational background as well as seniority of experience. For example, many of those promoted from the turn of the century onward had master's or doctorate degrees in fields such as economics. By the time of the Xi Jinping years, having a master's degree had become essentially a "standard requirement" for promotion to a provincial Standing Committee, with some of those promoted having academic experiences at the world's top universities. The type of degrees varied; although Masters of Business Administration (MBAs) were common, others had engineering or medical backgrounds.

Age
In terms of age, nearly all Shengwei Changwei who are not concurrently serving as party chief or head of government are between 45 and 60 years of age. It is general convention in the CCP that officials of sub-provincial (vice minister) rank retire at age 60. Unless they advance to full provincial rank, for example, by becoming a Governor, a provincial party chief, or a minister of the state, they usually relinquish their posts at age 60. On the other hand, officials below 45 years of age have next to no chances of making it to this elite level of the party organization. For example, as of 2017, the youngest person with a seat on a provincial Standing Committee was the Secretary-General of the Shanghai party organization, Zhuge Yujie (born 1971), who was 46 years old at the time of his appointment. The effect of this is that Shengwei Changwei usually sit on the body for no more than three terms (each term is five years). The pace of turnover in membership is rapid: departures occur frequently as members reach retirement age or as individuals are transferred to another province or a ministerial post.

Since the 1990s, the majority of national leaders have extensive regional experience prior to their promotion to the top. Therefore, it is possible to discern who may be up for promotion to the national level from current provincial Standing Committee members simply by determining the age of the candidates. Those in their late forties or early fifties are considered likely to earn promotion to the next level.

Regional profiles and ethnic minorities
Unlike party chiefs and governors, who usually serve in a variety of locales during their careers, many Shengwei Changwei are "native" to the province in which they serve. There are notable exceptions to this. For example, in Shanxi province following the "earthquake" that shook its political establishment in 2014, when the majority of the provincial Standing Committee was rounded up for investigation, removed from the body, or transferred. The 'renewed' committee was made up of people mostly not native to Shanxi province. Since Xi Jinping's assuming the General Secretary of the Chinese Communist Party in November 2012, many provinces have also seen Discipline Inspection chiefs being appointed by the centre and "parachuted" into their roles in the provinces.

Prior to the Xi Jinping years, ethnic minorities, with very rare exceptions, did not serve outside of their home region. Even within their home region, they often serve in 'token' positions - for example United Front chief, union leader, or, in some cases, no other position at all (essentially admitted to ensure ethnic balance on the body). However, since 2013, multiple ethnic minority officials have been transferred out of their home regions to take on positions in other provinces, including Ulan (Mongol), Erkenjen Turahom (Uyghur), and Liao Guoxun (Tujia).

Gender
As of July 2017, 35 of the 375 shengwei changwei were female. Of the provinces, Hunan had the highest representation of female shengwei changwei in the country: three members on the Hunan standing committee were women. 80% of female shengwei changwei had previous experience as the party chief of prefecture-level cities or equivalent jurisdictions. The majority of female shengwei changwei served as the heads of provincial party departments, such as United Front, Propaganda, Organization, or as leaders of discipline inspection. As of 2018, three women, Bu Xiaolin, Shen Yiqin, and Xian Hui (curiously, all ethnic minorities), served as the heads of government; He Rong, Huang Lixin, Ulan, and Yu Hongqiu served as deputy party chiefs - a post with substantial clout.

Advancement 
Being a provincial-level standing committee member has evolved to become a de facto "prerequisite" for advancing to higher levels of the party and government. For example, every member of the 18th Politburo Standing Committee had at one point in their career been a provincial standing committee member. Most provincial-level governors and party chiefs also have prior experience as a member of a provincial-level standing committee.

Certain standing committee seats are seen as having more weight than others, solely due to promotion structure and conventions that have congealed over the years. The Deputy Party Secretary is the most prestigious sub-provincial level post - it is generally seen as the final 'training ground' prior to a promotion to governorship or a minister-level state position. The party chiefs of provincial capitals or other sub-provincial cities also often receive promotions; these are positions of substantive power as they oversee aspects of an area that would otherwise normally fall under provincial jurisdiction. Another closely watched position is the party committee secretary-general, perhaps due to the close proximity to the machinery of the party organizations they serve, and the youthful profile of many of its officeholders signalling promotion potential.

List 

Note: Hong Kong, Macau, and the territories that are controlled by the Republic of China are excluded from this list.

Standing Committees below provincial level 
Below the provincial-level, all administrative jurisdictions down to the county level all have their respective Party Standing Committees ( or 党委常委会 for short). Like their provincial counterparts, these committees serve as the de facto highest local leadership council of the Chinese Communist Party in any area of jurisdiction. The composition of the council can be compared to the Politburo Standing Committee, the de facto highest decision making body of the country, but is not exactly the same. Local Standing Committees function as the highest policy making body within the party, but technically do not have executive powers of the government constitutionally.

The Standing Committee should not be confused with a "Party Committee", which is a distinct institution. A local Party Committee is a body composed of a much larger number of officials compared to the Party Standing Committee.

In general, the Party Standing Committee includes those concurrently holding the following positions:
 Party Committee Secretary (also known as "party chief")
 Deputy Party Secretary, Governor (Mayor)
 Discipline Inspection Secretary
 Politics and Legal Affairs Secretary
 Executive Vice Governor
 Head of local Organization Department
 Head of local Propaganda Department
 Secretary-General
 Party Secretaries of the largest subdivisions within the jurisdiction

See also 

 Central Committee of the Chinese Communist Party
 Communist Party Secretary
 Deputy Communist Party Secretary

Notes

References 

Provincial Standing Committee
China politics-related lists